The Valley of the Fallen (Spanish: Valle de los Caídos) is the former name of site now known officially as the Valle de Cuelgamuros
in the Sierra de Guadarrama, near Madrid,
Erected at Cuelgamuros Valley, it comprises a Catholic basilica and a monumental memorial in the municipality of San Lorenzo de El Escorial. Dictator Francisco Franco claimed that the monument was meant to be a "national act of atonement" and reconciliation. 

Although it appears that Franco did not specifically intend to be buried there, it served as his burial place from his death in November 1975 until his exhumation on 24 October 2019, as a result of efforts to remove all public veneration of his dictatorship, and following a long and controversial legal process.

The monument, considered a landmark of 20th-century Spanish architecture, was designed by Pedro Muguruza and Diego Méndez on a scale to equal, according to Franco, "the grandeur of the monuments of old, which defy time and memory." Together with the Universidad Laboral de Gijón, it is the most prominent example of the original Spanish Neo-Herrerian style, which was intended to form part of a revival of Juan de Herrera's architecture, exemplified by the nearby royal residence El Escorial. This uniquely Spanish architecture was widely used in public buildings of post-war Spain and is rooted in international fascist classicism as exemplified by Albert Speer or Mussolini's Esposizione Universale Roma.

Work started in 1940 and took over eighteen years to complete, with the monument being officially inaugurated on 1 April 1959. According to the official ledger, the cost of the construction totalled 1,159 million pesetas, funded through national lottery draws and donations. Some of the labourers were prisoners who traded their labour for a reduction in time served.

The complex is owned and operated by the Patrimonio Nacional, the Spanish governmental heritage agency, and ranked as the third most visited monument of the Patrimonio Nacional in 2009. The Spanish social democrat government closed the complex to visitors at the end of 2009, citing safety reasons connected to restoration on the façade. The decision was controversial, as the closure was attributed by some people to the Historical Memory Law enacted during José Luis Rodríguez Zapatero's premiership, and there were claims that the Benedictine community was being persecuted. The works include the Pietà sculpture prominently featured at the entrance of the crypt, using hammers and heavy machinery.

Basilica, cross and abbey 

One of the world's largest basilicas rises above the valley along with the tallest memorial cross in the world. The Basílica de la Santa Cruz del Valle de los Caídos (Basilica of the Holy Cross of the Valley of the Fallen) is hewn out of a granite ridge. The 150-metre-high (500 feet) cross is constructed of stone.

In 1960, Pope John XXIII declared the underground crypt a basilica. The dimensions of this underground basilica, as excavated, are larger than those of St. Peter's Basilica in Rome. To avoid competition with the apostle's grave church on the Vatican Hill, a partitioning wall was built near the inside of the entrance and a sizeable entryway was left unconsecrated.

The monumental sculptures over the main gate and the base of the cross culminated the career of Juan de Ávalos. The monument consists of a wide explanada (esplanade) with views of the valley and the outskirts of Madrid in the distance. A long vaulted crypt was tunnelled out of solid granite, piercing the mountain to the massive transept, which lies exactly below the cross.

On the wrought-iron gates, Franco's neo-Habsburg double-headed eagle is prominently displayed. On entering the basilica, visitors are flanked by two large metal statues of art deco angels holding swords.

There is a funicular that connects the basilica with the base of the cross. There is a spiral staircase and a lift inside the cross, connecting the top of the basilica dome to a trapdoor on top of the cross, but their use is restricted to maintenance staff.

The Benedictine Abbey of the Holy Cross of the Valley of the Fallen, on the other side of the mountain, houses priests who say perpetual Masses for the repose of the fallen of the Spanish Civil War and later wars and peacekeeping missions fought by the Spanish Army. The abbey ranks as a Royal Monastery.

Valley of the Fallen 
The valley that contains the monument, preserved as a national park, is located 10 km northeast of the royal site of El Escorial, northwest of Madrid. Beneath the valley floor lie the remains of 40,000 people, whose names are accounted for in the monument's register. The valley contains both Nationalist and Republican graves, but the dedication written in stone reads Caídos por Dios y por España (Fallen for God and for Spain, which is criticized because it was the francoist Spain motto) and numerous symbols of the Francoist regime.

Moroever, Republicans were interred here  mostly without the consent or even the knowledge of their families; some estimates claim that there are 33,800 victims of Francoism  interred — and their families have legal problems in recovering the remains of their family member. Franco was exhumed and removed from the church in 2019 as an effort to lower the public venaration of the place.

Franco's tomb (1975–2019) 

After the dictator's death, the interim Government led by Prince Juan Carlos and Prime Minister Carlos Arias Navarro designated the site in 1975 as his burial place. According to his family, Franco did not want to be buried in the Valley, but in the city of Madrid. Nonetheless, the family agreed to the interim Government's request to bury him in the Valley, and has stood by the decision.

Before his death, nobody had expected that Franco would be buried in the Valley. Moreover, the grave had to be excavated and prepared within two days, forcing last minute changes in the plumbing system of the Basilica. Unlike the fallen of the Civil War who were laid to rest in tombs behind the chapels on the sides of the basilica, Franco was buried behind the main altar, in the central nave. His grave is marked by a tombstone engraved with just his given name and first surname, on the choir side of the main high altar (between the altar and the apse of the Church; behind the altar, from the perspective of a person standing at the main door). 

Franco is the only person interred in the Valley who did not die in the Civil War. The argument given by the defenders of his tomb is that in the Catholic Church the developer of a church can be buried in the church that he has promoted. Therefore, Franco would be in the Valley as the promoter of the basilica's construction.

Franco was the second person interred in the Santa Cruz basilica. Franco had earlier interred José Antonio Primo de Rivera, the founder of the Falange movement, who was executed by the Republican government in 1936 and was buried by the Francoist government under a modest gravestone on the nave side of the altar. Primo de Rivera died on 20 November 1936, exactly 39 years before Franco. His grave is in the corresponding position on the other side of the altar. Accordingly, 20 November is annually commemorated by large crowds of Franco supporters and various Falange successor movements and individuals, flocking to the Requiem Masses held for the repose of the souls of their political leaders.

Exhumation and removal of Franco's remains

On 29 November 2011 the Expert Commission for the Future of the Valley of the Fallen, formed by the Spanish Socialist Workers' Party (PSOE) government of José Luis Rodríguez Zapatero on 27 May 2011 under the Historical Memory Law and charged to give advice for converting the Valley to a "memory centre that dignifies and rehabilitates the victims of the Civil War and the subsequent Franco regime," rendered a report recommending as its principal proposal for the commission's stated end the removal of the remains of Franco from the Valley for reburial at a location to be chosen by his family, but only after first obtaining a broad parliamentary consensus for such action. The Commission based its decision upon Franco having not died in the Civil War and the aim of the Commission that the Valley be exclusively for those on both sides who had died in the Civil War. In regard to Primo de Rivera the Commission recommended, since a victim of the Civil War, his remains should stay at the Valley but relocated within the Basilica mausoleum on equal footing with those remains of others who died in the conflict. The Commission further conditioned its recommendation for the removal of the remains of Franco from the Valley and the relocation of the remains of Primo de Rivera within the Basilica mausoleum upon the consent of the Catholic Church since "any action inside of the Basilica requires the permission of the Church." Three members of the twelve person commission gave a joint dissenting opinion opposing the recommendation for the removal of the remains of Franco from the Valley claiming such action would only further "divide and stress Spanish society." The Commission additionally proposed for its report creating a "meditation centre" in the Valley for those not of the Catholic faith, the names shown on the esplanade that leads into the Basilica mausoleum of all Civil War victims buried at the Valley who can be identified and an "interpretive centre" be built to explain how and why the Valley exists. The total cost of the proposed changes to the Valley was estimated by the Commission at €13 million. On 20 November, nine days before the issuance of the report of the commission and ironically on the 36th anniversary of the death of Franco, the conservative Popular Party (PP) won for the 2011 General Election absolute majorities in both Spain's lower house, the Congress of Deputies and Senate.

On 17 July 2012, Soraya Sáenz de Santamaría, vice-president and Spokesperson of the government stated during parliamentary questioning the PP government of President Mariano Rajoy had no intention of following the recommendations of the Expert Commission with respect to the removal of the remains of Franco, the relocation of the remains of Primo de Rivera within the Basilica or otherwise since the government considers the report to lack validity in that the commission was "monocolor" for which the PP was not invited or involved and that in light of Spain's present economic crisis, discussion and opinion as to the Valley would not be considered at this time.

On 10 October 2012 a motion of Basque Nationalist Party (PNV) Senator Iñaki Anasagasti placed before the full Senate calling for the removal of the remains of Franco from the Valley recommended by the Expert Commission was rejected by the PP majority. Together with the motion to remove the remains of Franco, the PP majority also voted down an amendment by the PSOE for the creation of a parliamentary committee to seek a consensus for the implementation of the recommendations of the Expert Commission. In a speech at the time before the Senate in defence of his party's no votes PP Senator Alejandro Muñoz-Alonso argued there was no consensus at present in Spain for implementing the recommendations of the Expert Commission and even the Expert Commission unilaterally formed by the Zapatero government was not unanimous, and the matter was now totally exhausted for having been raised eight times before the Parliament; and, then closed for his remarks by quoting from the Bible saying, "let the dead bury the dead" for urging the Senate in light of Spain's economic crisis to return to addressing the "problems of the living."

On 8 July 2013 a motion before the Senate of Catalan Agreement of Progress (ECP) to implement all recommendations made unanimously by the Expert Commission; that is, all recommendations with the exception only for the removal of the remains of Franco from the Valley, was voted down by the PP majority.

On 5 August 2013 the PP government by letter to PSOE deputy and former minister Ramón Jauregui reaffirmed its position that the recommendations of the Expert Commission would not be carried out since doing so absent in the view of the PP government a consensus in Spain for such action would "needlessly reopen old wounds". In regard to the expenditure of nearly €300,000 to restore the façade of the Basilica also questioned by former minister Jáuregui, the Rajoy government further stated for its correspondence such expenditures are justified since aimed at ensuring the monument is well preserved and to prevent deterioration and possible risks to visitors.

On 4 November 2013, Vice-president Soraya Sáenz de Santamaría again stated that due to the lack of a consensus among Spaniards concerning the future of the Valley the PP government would reject any legislation or request which would seek to remove the remains of Franco from the Valley for reburial at a location to be chosen by his family and further questioned the urgency for that legislation then presently introduced before the Parliament calling for the removal of the remains of Franco since during the entire seven-year term of the Zapatero government no attempt was made to so change the Valley.

On 23 November 2014, the PP government again re-affirmed its position that since a social and political consensus was absent for doing so there could be no changes or modifications to the Valley.

On 17 December 2014, PP and Asturias Forum (FAC) members of the Committee for Culture of the Congress of Deputies together voted down a proposed law put forward by the PSOE to "redefine" the Valley to reflect a "culture of co-existence," and amendment of the United Left to exhume the remains of Franco and Primo de Rivera, identify the remains of all Civil War victims buried in the basilica mausoleum, and address the claims of descendants whose ancestors were buried there without family consent. During parliamentary debate for the proposal of the PSOE, PP deputy Rocío López argued "let the dead rest in peace" and the Valley is a church and cemetery conceived as a peaceful place "without political significance" for the meeting and reconciliation of both sides of the Civil War that should not be changed or modified, while in support of the proposal PSOE deputy Odón Elorza contended the monument is instead a "symbol of contempt and exclusion" to Spaniards.

On 9 February 2017 the PSOE introduced in the Constitutional Commission Committee of the Congress of Deputies a non-binding motion calling for the removal of the remains of Franco from the Valley and the creation of a  "truth commission" to investigate the Franco years (1939-1975). On 8 March 2017 the PSOE motion was debated and voted on in committee with only the PP voting no and Navarrese People's Union (UPN) abstaining, and all other parties voting yes. On 3 April 2017 the Constitutional Commission of the Senate rejected a motion presented by the PNV to re-designate the Valley to a centre for interpretation of the Civil War.

On 11 May 2017 a non-binding motion put forth by the PSOE calling for the removal of the remains of Franco from the Valley and relocation of the remains of Primo de Rivera to a less prominent place within the Basilica mausoleum was approved in plenary session by the Congress of Deputies with 198 votes in favour, 1 against and 140 abstentions. Deputies of both the PP and Republican Left of Catalonia (ERC) abstained with the one no vote having been made in error by a PP deputy. The motion further called for the creation of a truth commission, the declaration of 11 November as a day of remembrance for victims of Fascism, the government undertake necessary actions for the location and exhumation of graves and identification of the remains of victims of the Civil War and dictatorship, and the Valley be converted from a "Francoist and National-Catholic landmark" to instead a "space for reconciliation and collective and democratic memory, aimed at dignifying and recognizing the victims of the Spanish Civil War and of the dictatorship". The PP government responded it would not act on the PSOE motion as to the Valley because it considered the Valley to no longer be a Francoist monument since governed by rules generally applicable to places of worship and public cemeteries and by law acts are prohibited at the Valley of a political nature or exalt of the Civil War, its protagonists, or Franco and the Historical Memory Law does not contemplate or call for the disinterment of anyone.

On 18 June 2018 the PSOE government of Prime Minister Pedro Sánchez which came to power on 2 June 2018 following a successful motion of no-confidence against the PP government of Mariano Rajoy announced its intention to remove the remains of Franco from the Valley. Since the PSOE has only 85 deputies in a parliament of 350, any legislation to remove the remains of Franco would require the support of other groups. On 29 June 2018 the Archdiocese of Madrid warned the Spanish government against any plans to exhume the remains of Franco without first obtaining agreement from interested parties and formally stated it is against any move of Franco's remains without the consent of his family and before consultation with the Catholic Church. In addition for its statement, the Archdiocese of Madrid re-affirmed its position that although the Valley is officially a national monument, the Catholic Church must be consulted on burial-related matters under agreements between the Spanish state and the Vatican. The announcement of the Archdiocese of Madrid was made after Sánchez confirmed that it was his intention to remove the remains of Franco by the end of July.

On 24 August 2018 the cabinet of the PSOE government approved a decree that modifies two aspects of the 2007 Historical Memory law to permit the exhumation. For the decree to become law it must be passed by a vote of the Congress of Deputies. The PP and the center-right party Ciudadanos announced they would not support the decree. The PP further stated it would appeal the measure to the Constitutional Court arguing using a decree to change the Historical Memory Law is not valid because the proposed modifications do not respond to a situation of urgent need. At the time the cabinet approved the decree Deputy Prime Minister Carmen Calvo stated the decree law requires the exhumation of the remains of Franco to take place between 30 days and 12 of months of passage by the Congress of Deputies and the family of Franco would have two weeks to designate a place for re-interment of his remains, and should they fail to do so, the Spanish government would then choose a "dignified and respectful" place for his remains to be re-interred.

On 13 September 2018 the Congress of Deputies approved by a vote of 176 in favour, 165 abstentions and 2 no votes the proposed decree of the PSOE government to modify two aspects of the 2007 Historical Memory law to permit the exhumation of the remains of Francisco Franco from the Valley of the Fallen. All deputies of the Spanish Socialist Workers' Party, Podemos, ERC, PNV, Catalan European Democratic Party (PDeCAT), EH Bildu, Coalició Compromís and the Canarian Coalition (CC) voted in favour of the decree while all 165 abstention votes were cast by PP and Citizens Party (C's) deputies with 2 no votes of PP deputies said to have been made "by mistake." After the vote, the PP re-affirmed it would appeal the legality of the decree on the grounds of lack of extraordinary and urgent need necessary for such a decree law to the Constitutional Court.

On 15 February 2019 the Council of Ministers agreed to go forward with the exhumation and gave the Franco family 15 days to decide upon where its desires for the remains of Franco be re-interred but prohibited re-interment at the Cathedral of La Almudena in Madrid for reasons stated by the Council of Ministers of "public order and security," and further announced in the event the family of Franco failed to respond within the 15 day period, the Government would then proceed forward with the exhumation and the Council of Ministers would decide the place for the re-interment of Franco's remains. The family of Franco had previously made plain its intention to appeal to the Supreme Court the decision of the Government.

On 8 March 2019 the Supreme Court admitted the appeal of the Franco family contesting the constitutionality of the agreement of the Government adopted 15 February 2019. For its appeal the family also challenged the constitutionality of the rejection by the government for any re-interment at the Cathedral of La Almudena. On 12 March 2019 the Benedictine Community of the Abbey of the Valley of the Fallen appealed to the Supreme Court the constitutionality of the agreement of the Government for the exhumation contending the exhumation cannot take place without "ecclesiastical authorization." In addition, the appeal of the Benedictine Community disputed the constitutionality of the Decree-Law of October 2018 on the grounds the Benedictine Community contends it would require as well the removal of the remains of 20 Benedictine monks buried at the Valley but who also did not die in the Civil War.

On 15 March 2019 the government of Pedro Sanchez announced that Franco would be exhumed and reburied at Mingorrubio Cemetery in El Pardo with his wife Carmen Polo, and that the exhumation would take place on 10 June 2019, assuming the Supreme Court did not issue a precautionary order preventing the exhumation until a decision for those appeals of the Franco family and Benedictine Community presently before it.

On 19 March 2019 the Francisco Franco National Foundation filed an appeal with the Supreme Court contending the February agreement of the Council of Ministers for the exhumation is "null and void" for violating "openly" not only the Constitution, but as well the royal decree that modifies the law of Historical Memory and "all the regulations that make up the legal regime" of the B, in addition to European laws and regulations. The Franco Foundation further prayed the Supreme Court stay any action to remove the remains of Franco during the pendency of its appeal.

On 4 June 2019 the five magistrates of the Fourth Administrative Contentious Division of the Supreme Court unanimously suspended the exhumation pending a final decision for those appeals in opposition to the exhumation filed by the Franco Family, the Benedictine Community, the Franco Foundation and the Association for the Defense of the Valley of the Fallen.

On 24 September 2019 the Supreme Court unanimously ruled in favour of exhumation and rejected the arguments put forward by Franco's family. It was reported that the exhumation could take place before 10 November 2019 Spanish election and would inter Franco's remains in the El Pardo Cemetery.

On 21 October 2019 the government announced that Franco's remains would be exhumed on 24 October 2019 from the Valley and reburied at Mingorrubio Cemetery.

On 24 October 2019, in the presence of Franco's relatives and Dolores Delgado, Spain's Minister of Justice, the coffin containing Franco's remains was exhumed from the basilica in the Valley of the Fallen. The coffin was carried out into the plaza by members of the dictator's family, who exclaimed: ′¡Viva España! ¡Viva Franco!′ (′Long live Spain! Long live Franco!′) as they lowered it into a hearse. It was then secured in a waiting helicopter, which transported it to the Mingorrubio-El Pardo municipal cemetery, where Franco was reburied alongside his wife, Carmen Polo. The Franco family chose Ramón Tejero, an Andalucían parish priest, and son of the Guardia Civil lieutenant colonel Antonio Tejero, who violently stormed the Spanish Parliament during the unsuccessful military coup on 23 February 1981, to say mass at the reinterment ceremony.

Controversy

Presenting the monument in a politically neutral way poses a number of problems, not least of which is the strength of opposing opinions on the issue. The Times quoted Jaume Bosch, a Catalan politician and former MP seeking to change the monument, as saying: "I want what was in reality something like a Nazi concentration camp to stop being a nostalgic place of pilgrimage for Francoists. Inevitably, whether we like it or not, it's part of our history. We don't want to pull it down, but the Government has agreed to study our plan."

The charge that the monument site was "like a Nazi concentration camp" refers to the use of convict labour, including Republican prisoners, who traded their labour for a reduction in time served. Although Spanish law prohibited the use of forced labour at the time, it did provide for convicts to choose voluntary work on the basis of redeeming two days of conviction for each day worked. This law remained in force until 1995. This benefit was increased to six days when labour was carried out at the basilica with a salary of 7 pesetas per day, a regular worker's salary at the time, with the possibility that the family of the convict would benefit from the housing and Catholic children's schools that were built in the valley for them by the other workers. Only convicts with a record of good behaviour would qualify for this redemption scheme, because the work site was considered to be a low security environment. The motto used by the Nationalist government was "el trabajo ennoblece" ("work ennobles").

It is claimed that by 1943, the number of prisoners who were working at the site reached close to six hundred. It is also claimed that up to 20,000 prisoners were used for the overall construction of the monument and that forced labour was used.

According to the official programme records, 2,643 workers directly participated in the construction, and some of them were highly skilled, as was required by the complexity of the work. Only 243 of these were convicts. During the eighteen-year construction period, the official tally of workers who died as a result of accidents totalled fourteen.

The socialist Spanish government of 2004-2011 instituted a statewide policy of removal of Francoist symbols from public buildings and spaces, leading to an uneasy relationship with a monument that is the most conspicuous legacy of Franco's rule.

Political rallies in celebration of Franco are now banned by the Historical Memory Law, voted on by the Congress of Deputies on 16 October 2007. This law dictated that "the management organisation of the Valley of the Fallen should aim to honour the memory of all of those who died during the civil war and who suffered repression". It has been suggested that the Valley of the Fallen be re-designated as a "monument to Democracy" or as a memorial to all Spaniards killed in conflict "for Democracy". Some organisations, among them centrist Catholic groups, question the purpose of these plans, on the basis that the monument is already dedicated to all of the dead, civilian and military of both Nationalist and Republican sides.

Closure and reopening of the monument 
In November 2009, Patrimonio Nacional controversially ordered the closure of the basilica for an indefinite period of time, alleging preservation issues also affecting the Cross and some sculptures. These allegations were contested by some experts and by the Benedictine Order religious community that lives at the complex, and were seen by some conservative opinion groups as a policy of harassment against the monument. In 2010, the Pietà sculpture group started to be "dismantled" with hammers and heavy machinery, which the Juan de Ávalos trust feared could cause irreparable damage to the sculpture. As a result, thereof, the trust filed several lawsuits against the Spanish government. At the time, several parallels were made by conservative and liberal groups between the dismantling of the Pietà under the PSOE government and the destruction of the Buddhas of Bamyan by the Taliban.

Following the November 2011 Spanish General Election, on 1 June 2012 the conservative PP government of Mariano Rajoy reopened the monument to the public with the exception only of the base of the cross, in the past accessible by cable car or on foot, which will remain closed to ascent while the sculptures of the four apostles and the cardinal virtues forming part of the base of the cross are presently under engineering review and restoration for cracks and other deterioration. Beginning on 1 June 2012 the charge for entry to the monument had been 5 euros. The 5 euro entry fee was anticipated to generate around 2 million euros a year if the Valley of the Fallen once again attracted 500,000 visitors annually, the approximate number of annual visitors before closure of the monument in 2009 by the PSOE government. Starting on 2 May 2013, and over the strong objection of the Association for the Defense of the Valley of the Fallen, the entry fee for the monument was increased from 5 to 9 euros.
Prior to its closure in 2009, the Valley of the Fallen was the third most visited site of the Patrimonio Nacional after only the Royal Palace of Madrid and El Escorial.  For the accommodation of visitors a cafeteria restaurant located in the cable car building of the monument has been re-opened. The Valley of the Fallen attracted 254,059 visitors in 2015, 262,860 visitors in 2016 and 283,263 visitors in 2017. There were 378,875 visitors in 2018 to the Valley of the Fallen and 318,248 visitors in 2019.

In popular culture

The Valle de los Caídos appears in Richard Morgan's 2002 novel Altered Carbon, where it is being used as a base of operations for one of the major antagonists, Reileen Kawahara.

It also appears in the 2010 Spanish dark comedy film The Last Circus (Spanish: Balada triste de trompeta), as a visual homage to the climactic Mount Rushmore scene in the Hitchcock classic North by Northwest.

Graham Greene's 1982 novel Monsignor Quixote uses a visit to the Valle to illustrate the competing political and social attitudes to Franco's reign and the status of his tomb in modern Spain.

There is also a large reference to this monument and the labourers who built it in Victoria Hislop's book The Return.

In 2013, Spain saw the release of the film All'Ombra Della Croce (A la Sombra de la Cruz) directed by the Italian filmmaker Alessandro Pugno. The film tells the secret story of the children of the chorus who sing every day in the mass. They live in a boarding school inside the monument and receive a traditional education. The film has been awarded with the first prize for the best documentary at Festival de Málaga de Cine Español.

In the 2016 film The Queen of Spain, actor Antonio Resines plays Blas Fontiverosa, a film director who returns to Spain after fleeing following the Civil War and is captured and forced to work on the construction of the Valley.

In 2016, Mayor of Madrid Manuela Carmena, proposed to change the site's name from "El Valle de los Caídos" to "El Valle de la Paz" (The Valley of Peace).

The monument’s construction and significance is paralleled with that of El Escorial in Carlos Fuentes’s 1975 novel Terra Nostra.

The monument's name is the title of a 1978 novel by the Spanish author Carlos Rojas Vila. Part of the novel's plot is set in the late days of the Francoist Spain.

The monument appears in Dan Brown's novel Origin.

See also 
 Burial of Ferdinand Marcos
 Imperial Route of the Community of Madrid

References

Further reading
 
 Stockey, Gareth. Valley of the Fallen: The (N)ever Changing Face of General Franco's Monument (CCC Press, 2013).

External links

 WAIS Forum on Spain, 2003: "Spain: the Valley of the Fallen": includes quote from Franco's decree, 1 April 1940
 Abadía de la Santa Cruz del Valle de los Caídos: Official Website .
 El Valle de los Caídos: 
 Fundación Francisco Franco, Valle de los Caídos: from Franco's Memorial Trust 
 Valley of the Fallen: visitor information and photos
 Cruz de los Caídos drawings and plans from the architectural website skyscraperpage.com
 The Valley of the Fallen: History and Photos.
 "Manifesto for historians regarding the Valley of the Fallen" by Pío Moa, leading Spanish historian about the construction of the monument and the alleged government policy of harassment  

Basilica churches in Spain
Mausoleums in Spain
Monuments and memorials in the Community of Madrid
Spanish Civil War
Benedictine monasteries in Spain
Monasteries in the community of Madrid
Buildings and structures in the Community of Madrid
Tourist attractions in the Community of Madrid
Monumental crosses
Francisco Franco
Fascist architecture
Francoist monuments and memorials in Spain
Victory monuments